State Route 144 (SR 144) is a  east–west state highway in the eastern part of the U.S. state of Alabama. It travels from U.S. Route 231 (US 231) in St. Clair County near Pell City to US 431 at Alexandria in Calhoun County. The highway is two lanes for its entire length. The highway also crosses the Coosa River using the bridge across the Neely Henry Dam.

Route description

History
Until 1997, the section of SR 144 between SR 77 and US 431 was designated as SR 62. SR 62 is now assigned to a short highway in Marshall County. Also, the section of SR 144 between SR 77 and Ragland was signed as St. Clair County Route 26 (CR 26) until SR 144 was extended eastward.

Major intersections

See also

References

144
Transportation in St. Clair County, Alabama
Transportation in Calhoun County, Alabama